Robert Ward may refer to:

Politicians
Robert Ward (MP for City of York)
 Robert Ward (1754–1831), Irish MP for Wicklow Borough, Killyleagh and Bangor
 Robert Ward (American politician) (1952–2021), American lawyer and politician
 Robert Ward (British politician) (1871–1942), British Conservative party politician
 Robert Plumer Ward (1765–1846), English novelist and politician
 Robert W. Ward (1929–1997), Secretary of State of Alaska, 1969–1970

Sportspeople
 Bob Ward (footballer) (1881–?), Scottish footballer
 Bobby Ward (born 1958), Scottish football player (Celtic, Newport County)
 Robbie Ward (born 1995), English rugby league footballer
 Bob Ward (American football, born 1927) (1927–2005), former player and head coach of the University of Maryland Terrapins
 Bob Ward (American football, born 1933) (1933–2021), coach for the Dallas Cowboys

Others
 Robert Ward (baseball) (active 1914–15), American owner of the Brooklyn Tip Tops
 Robert Ward (blues musician) (1938–2008), American blues guitarist and singer
 Robert Ward (British Army officer) (born 1931)
 Robert Ward (composer) (1917–2013), American composer of classical music
 Robert Ward (novelist) (active since 1972), American author and screenwriter
 Robert Ward (scholar), English scholar active in the seventeenth century
 Robert Ward (travel writer) (active since 2002), Canadian author
 Robert DeCourcy Ward (1867–1931), American climatologist and eugenics proponent
 Robert George Ward (1928–2013), Australian metallurgist
 Robert Joseph Ward (1926–2003), American judge
 Bob Ward (communications director) (active since 2008), policy and communications director of the Grantham Research Institute on Climate Change and the Environment